The Bishop of Down, Connor and Dromore was the Ordinary of the Church of Ireland diocese of Down, Connor and Dromore; comprising all County Down and County Antrim, including the city of Belfast.

History
The episcopal sees of Down and Connor were united in 1442. After the Reformation, the bishopric of Down and Connor continued until 1842 when they were amalgamated with the see of Dromore to form the united see of Down, Connor and Dromore. Since 1945, the see has been separated into the bishopric of Down and Dromore and the bishopric of Connor.

List of bishops

See also

List of Anglican diocesan bishops in Britain and Ireland
List of Anglican dioceses in the United Kingdom and Ireland
List of Roman Catholic dioceses in Ireland

References

Down, Connor and Dromore
Down, Connor and Dromore
Religion in County Antrim
Religion in County Down
Bishops of Down, Connor and Dromore
Bishops of Down or Connor or of Dromore